Dr. Zilog is a chiptune metal trio from Denver, Colorado.   The band blends 8-bit chiptune melodies with real guitars and drums.

Career
Dr. Zilog first gained notoriety in the chiptune community releasing 8-bit covers of indie pop hits like Animal Collective's song 'My Girls' and MGMT's hit 'Kids' to the chiptune community site 8-bit Collective in 2009.

Dr. Zilog was credited as the composer of the soundtrack to the 2015 indie video game Temple of Yog on the Wii U, with Vice making a comparison to the soundtracks of classic Amiga video games developed by The Bitmap Brothers.

The band played at MagFest in 2018.

Discography
Albums
 2008: The Satellite of Love
 2009: Chip 'Em All
 2010: Endless Hallway
 2011: RetroActivity
 2012: Vulgar Fractions
 2016: Unknown Command
 2017: Obstreperous

References

External links
 
 
 

Video game musicians
American electronic music groups